This article shows all participating team squads at the 2013 FIVB Women's World Grand Champions Cup, held from November 12 to November 17, 2013 in Japan.

The following is the Brazil roster in the 2013 FIVB Women's World Grand Champions Cup.

The following is the Dominican Republic roster in the 2013 FIVB Women's World Grand Champions Cup.

The following is the Japan roster in the 2013 FIVB Women's World Grand Champions Cup.

The following is the Russia roster in the 2013 FIVB Women's World Grand Champions Cup.

The following is the Thailand roster in the 2013 FIVB Women's World Grand Champions Cup.

The following is the United States roster in the 2013 FIVB Women's World Grand Champions Cup.

References 

G
FIVB Women's Volleyball World Grand Champions Cup squads